Crossed Lines is a Chinese comedy anthology film.

Cast

Segment 1: "The Misunderstanding"
Director: Liu Yiwei
Yang Lixin
Xu Zheng
Xu Fan
Liu Yiwei

Segment 2: "The Eulogy"
Director: Lin Jinhe
Fan Bingbing
Wang Xuebing
Che Yongli
Jin Sha

Segment 3: "The Sticks"
Director: Sun Zhou
Ge You
Yan Ni
Mao Junjie
Sun Zhou

Segment 4: "The Boy Who Cried Wolf"
Director: Shen Lei & Alfred Cheung
Chiu Hsin-chih
Yao Chen
Annie Yi
Kong Wei
Michelle Bai
Aya Liu

Reception
The film was released on 29 November 2007, and reached number one at mainland China box office for two consecutive weeks. It earned a total of 35 million RMB as of 23 December 2007.

References

External links
 Crossed Lines at the Chinese Movie Database

2007 films
2000s Mandarin-language films
2007 comedy films
Chinese anthology films
Chinese comedy films
Films directed by Sun Zhou